Enrique 'Quique' Ramos González (born 7 March 1956) is a Spanish retired professional footballer who played as a defensive midfielder.

Club career
Born in Madrid, Ramos finished his football formation at Atlético Madrid, making his first-team debut in 1979 and proceeding to be a regular fixture for the following nine years, helping the capital side to the 1985 Copa del Rey and Supercopa de España.

However, after the 1987–88 season, mainly due to serious personal problems with elusive club chairman Jesús Gil, he left the Colchoneros and retired altogether – after one year of inactivity – in June 1990, with lowly Rayo Vallecano, being relegated from La Liga.

International career
Ramos represented Spain on four occasions, for as many years. His debut came on 18 February 1981, in a friendly with France (1–0 win).

Honours
Atlético Madrid
Copa del Rey: 1984–85
Supercopa de España: 1985
UEFA Cup Winners' Cup: runner-up 1985–86

References

External links
 
 
 
 

1956 births
Living people
Footballers from Madrid
Spanish footballers
Association football midfielders
La Liga players
Segunda División B players
Atlético Madrid B players
Atlético Madrid footballers
Rayo Vallecano players
Spain under-21 international footballers
Spain under-23 international footballers
Spain amateur international footballers
Spain B international footballers
Spain international footballers
Olympic footballers of Spain
Footballers at the 1980 Summer Olympics